The 2014 Russian Football Super Cup (Russian: Суперкубок России по футболу) was the 12th Russian Super Cup match, a football match which was contested between the 2013–14 Russian Premier League champion, CSKA Moscow, and the 2013–14 Russian Cup champion, Rostov.

The match was held on 26 July 2014 at the Kuban Stadium, in Krasnodar.

Match details

See also
2014–15 Russian Premier League
2014–15 Russian Cup

References

Super Cup
Russian Super Cup
Russian Super Cup 2014
Russian Super Cup 2014
Sport in Krasnodar